Cyperus betafensis is a species of sedge that is endemic to central Madagascar.

The species was first formally described by the botanist Henri Chermezon in 1922.

See also
 List of Cyperus species

References

betafensis
Taxa named by Henri Chermezon
Plants described in 1922
Endemic flora of Madagascar